In Concert is a late-night television series created by Don Kirshner.  Hosted by Don Branker, the series was a showcase for bands of the era to be taped "in concert" and then broadcast on ABC on Friday nights.

In Concert
The series premiered on November 24, 1972, preempting The Dick Cavett Show. The first episode was the broadcast of a concert taped at Hofstra University on September 21, 1972 with Alice Cooper, Bo Diddley, Curtis Mayfield, and Seals & Crofts.  The second episode, broadcast on December 8, 1972 and again preempting Cavett, featured The Allman Brothers Band and Chuck Berry. David Sontag became the executive producer of In Concert starting with the 3rd show and for the rest of the first season. Don Kirshner had no direct connection with the show after the second episode except that the production credits listed In Concert as a "David Sontag Production" and a "Don Kirshner Production". Starting with the 3rd episode there was no host; Joshua White (Joshua Lightshow) became the director and the voice-over announcing the acts, and serving as the production stage manager was Chip Monk, often known as the voice of Woodstock.
 
In January 1973, both The Dick Cavett Show and In Concert became part of ABC's Wide World of Entertainment programming block.  Kirshner left in late 1973 to produce the syndicated series Don Kirshner's Rock Concert.  In Concert continued to appear approximately every other Friday night until it left the ABC schedule on April 25, 1975.

During its three seasons on the air, the series received four Primetime Emmy Awards.

ABC In Concert
The series was revived on June 7, 1991 under the name In Concert '91. It was intended to be a summer replacement for Rick Dees' late night series Into The Night. In Concert '91 proved to be more popular and achieved high ratings for a late-night show on Fridays. Into the Night was consequently not brought back for the next season. In Concert '91 featured both newer performers (e.g. Alice in Chains, Poison) and more established acts (e.g. David Bowie, Cher, Judas Priest, Phil Collins), and was simulcast in stereo on ABC radio stations.  It was renamed ABC In Concert in January 1992 and aired its final episode on September 11, 1998.

ABC In Concert Country
Created as a country music counterpart to ABC In Concert, ABC In Concert Country premiered on June 4, 1994.  It was hosted by Billy Dean and featured performers such as Billy Ray Cyrus, Travis Tritt, and Trisha Yearwood.  This series lasted just over two months, with its final episode airing on August 10, 1994.

Local standards controversy
The first In Concert broadcast was terminated early in Cincinnati, Ohio; the station manager of then-ABC affiliate WKRC-TV was watching Alice Cooper's segment and was so disgusted by it that he called the station's master control room and ordered the station to take it off the air. A rerun of Rawhide was hastily substituted; both WKRC and Cincinnati newspapers received numerous nasty phone calls in protest, which included several bomb threats against the station. The story became front-page news in Cincinnati newspapers for the next several days.

References

External links

1972 American television series debuts
1973 American television series endings
1991 American television series debuts
1998 American television series endings
1970s American music television series
1990s American music television series
English-language television shows
American television series revived after cancellation
ABC late-night programming
1990s American late-night television series